Aliyat Al-Shorta Sport Club is an Iraqi sports club based in Baghdad. Its football team plays in the Iraq Division Two.

History
The Aliyat Al-Shorta team was founded in 1961 by the Police Games Committee. They were promoted to the Iraq Central FA First Division, the top division for teams in Baghdad and its neighbouring cities, in 1963 after winning the third and second divisions in succession. They clinched promotion with a 3–1 win over Al-Omma after extra time on 29 June 1963. Aliyat Al-Shorta went on to become one of the strongest teams in the region under the management of Mohammed Najeeb Kaban, winning three top-flight league titles in a row (1967–68, 1968–69 and 1969–70) and leading the league in the 1966–67 season before it was cancelled.

In 1971, Aliyat Al-Shorta became the first Iraqi team to take part in Asia's main club competition, the Asian Champion Club Tournament, and made history by becoming the first Arab side to reach the final. They won all the games they took to the field for en route to the final of the tournament, including two wins against the competition's defending champions Taj Tehran, but refused to face Israeli club Maccabi Tel Aviv for political reasons, waving the Palestinian flag around the field and taking the runner-up spot. They were regarded as champions by the Iraqi media and were greeted with a heroes' welcome upon their return to the country, holding an open top bus parade. Aliyat Al-Shorta won the league title again in 1971–72, followed by two consecutive league runner-up finishes.

In 1974, the Iraq Football Association (IFA) decided to implement a clubs-only policy for domestic competitions, forming the Iraqi National Clubs First Division which was only open to clubs and not institute-representative teams such as Aliyat Al-Shorta. With the IFA dictating that only a single club would be allowed to represent the Police in the new top-flight, Al-Shorta Sports Club was established on 18 August 1974 by the Iraqi Olympic Committee, replacing Aliyat Al-Shorta, Shortat Al-Najda, Kuliyat Al-Shorta and Shortat Erbil in the top-flight. As a result, Aliyat Al-Shorta were consigned to competing in non-IFA tournaments, and the team finished in third place in the Armed Forces League in the 1974–75 season.

After that season, a proposal was made by former international referee Ghani Hussein Al-Jabouri for Aliyat Al-Shorta to enter the National Clubs First Division under the name Al-Dakhiliya SC but it was not approved. Ten players from Aliyat Al-Shorta subsequently joined Al-Shorta Sports Club to compete in the National Clubs First Division in the 1975–76 season, and from 1975, Aliyat Al-Shorta participated in the Iraqi Police Football League, which the team won on twelve occasions.

In 1989, Aliyat Al-Shorta entered the Ministry of Interior tournaments. In 1992, Aliyat Al-Shorta were eliminated from the semi-finals of the National Security Championship with a 2–1 loss to Shorta Baghdad. In 2009, Aliyat Al-Shorta participated in the Minister of Interior Cup but were beaten 5–0 by Al-Jinsiya. In 2011, the Baghdad Police Command almost dissolved Aliyat Al-Shorta but decided against doing so after appeals from team members.

On 12 June 2017, Aliyat Al-Shorta were granted a preliminary foundation permit by the Ministry of Youth and Sports for a period of six months, allowing them to be established as a sports club once the foundation requirements were met. In November 2017, Aliyat Al-Shorta were granted the full permit and were registered as a sports club, entering the lower divisions of Iraqi club football organised by the IFA. In 2022, the club was promoted to the Iraq Division Two for the first time after a 2–1 win over Al-Atheer in Baghdad Group 2 of the 2021–22 Iraq Division Three.

Managers

Honours

Major

Minor
Iraqi Police Football League
Winners (12)
Police Director General Cup
Winners (2): 1965, 1972
Commander in Chief of the Armed Forces Cup
Winners (1): 1970
Alexandria International Summer Tournament
Winners (1): 1967
Police Cup Championship
Winners (1): 1965

Statistics

In domestic competitions

Regional

National

References

Football clubs in Iraq
1961 establishments in Iraq
Association football clubs established in 1961
Football clubs in Baghdad